"Low Rider" is a song written by American funk band War and producer Jerry Goldstein, which appeared on their album Why Can't We Be Friends?, released in 1975. It reached number one on the Billboard R&B singles chart, peaked at number seven on the Hot 100 singles chart, and number six in Canada.

According to the AllMusic review of the song, "the lyric takes the cool, laidback image of the lowrider—the Chicano culture practice of hydraulically hot-rodding classic cars—and using innuendo, extends the image to a lifestyle". The song features a driving bass line by B. B. Dickerson, which is present almost throughout, and an alto saxophone riff by Charles Miller, who also provides lead vocals and a saxophone solo towards the end of the song that includes a siren-like noise. This song is the theme song for the TV series George Lopez, which ran from 2002 to 2007. The song was also featured in films Robots, Dazed and Confused, Friday, The Happytime Murders, Paulie, 21 Grams, The Odd Life of Timothy Green, the 2000 remake of Gone in 60 Seconds, Beverly Hills Ninja, The Internship, A Knight's Tale, The Original Latin Kings of Comedy, Colors, Up in Smoke, A Gnome Named Gnorm, Beverly Hills Chihuahua, The Young Poisoner's Handbook, Blood In Blood Out and Love Potion No. 9 and in TV shows Family Guy, The Simpsons, Scandal, Shameless, Misfits, Beverly Hills, 90210 and Friday Night Lights.

Charts

References

War (American band) songs
1975 singles
Funk songs
Songs about cars
United Artists Records singles
Comedy television theme songs